Caught in the Act is the second studio album by The Commodores, released in 1975 (see 1975 in music). Caught in the Act included the #1 R&B hit "Slippery When Wet", penned by Thomas McClary, the sextet's lead guitarist. (The Commodores 1974 song "I Feel Sanctified" has been called a "prototype" of Wild Cherry's 1976 hit "Play That Funky Music")

Caught In The Act was the second Commodores album to be certified gold. It rose to #7 on the Billboard R&B/Soul Albums chart and #26 on the Billboard Top 100 Albums listing during the summer of 1975.  It received generally positive reviews. The album displayed clear influences from fellow funk contemporaries Sly and the Family Stone, Earth, Wind & Fire and the Ohio Players, but yet the former opening act for the Jackson 5 was on its way to developing a sound that became all their own. They were a tight, self-contained unit that composed all their own material, unlike what was presented on their debut album,  which included songs by outside writers. Lead vocals were handled by drummer/percussionist Walter "Clyde" Orange and pianist/saxophonist Lionel Richie. 

The third track on Caught In The Act, "The Bump", composed by group keyboardist Milan Williams, is an edited version of the fourth track in their preceding hit album, Machine Gun. "I'm Ready", also a Williams composition, is a punchy instrumental dance number with a prominent clavinet line, in the same vein as their earlier hit, "Machine Gun".  Other solid funk tracks include "Wide Open", "Better Never Than Forever" and "Look What You've Done to Me". "Let's Do It Right" by Lionel Richie echoes the smoother side of Sly and the Family Stone's work. While Caught In The Act is overwhelmingly upbeat, it doesn't neglect the slower material: "This Is Your Life" and "You Don't Know That I Know" are first rate funk  ballads; the former, written by Richie, was released in an edited version as a single that same year and peaked at #13 on the Billboard R&B charts.

Track listing
Motown – M6-820S1

Personnel 

Commodores
 Lionel Richie – vocals, saxophones, keyboards
 Milan Williams – keyboards
 Thomas McClary – vocals, guitars
 Ronald LaPread – bass
 Walter Orange – vocals, drums, percussion
 William King – trumpet

Production 
 Produced and arranged by James Anthony Carmichael and The Commodores. 
 Horns arranged by James Anthony Carmichael
 Recorded and Mixed by Cal Harris
 Album Coordinator and Management – Benjamin Ashburn 
 Art Direction – Katarina Pettersson
 Photography – Jim Britt

Charts

Singles

References

External links
 Commodores-Caught In The Act at Discogs

1975 albums
Commodores albums
Albums produced by James Anthony Carmichael
Albums produced by Lionel Richie
Motown albums